Universum College (Albanian: Kolegji Universum) is a university in Prishtina, Kosovo.  It was  founded in 2005 . The university offers 15 undergraduate programs and 8 graduate programs. Studies can be offered with dual study memberships (internship and study) or double degrees with EU universities for specific studies. The college as a higher education provider is accredited by the Kosovo Accreditation Agency. The university is partnered up with 152 (28 EU countries) universities within the Erasmus+ program. Universum College is also accredited by the University of Northampton to offer programs with English curricula and standards. Students who attend these programs will receive a University of Northampton degree. UON is one of the universities listed in the Teaching Excellence Framework (TEF).

Universum College also offers two professional programs that are accredited by Pearson Plc. – Level 5 in Nursing and Level 5 in Integrated Design.

Recently, Eduniveral ranked Universum College in Top 1000 of the best Business Schools in the world.

Mission 
The university aims to prepare students to be successful, responsible citizens, give them study experiences abroad and to support economic development in Kosovo and the region.

Campuses 
Universum College has three campuses. One is located in Pristina (Lipjan), one in Ferizaj and one in Gjakova.

Study Programs 
The university offers undergraduate programs in :
 Business and Management
 Dental Esthetics and Hygiene
 Digital Journalism
 Cyber security
 Physiotherapy
 Political Science
 Computer Science
German Language
Graphic design
English Language
Law
Nursing

Postgraduate 
The university offers postgraduate programs in

 Management
 Tourism Management
 Finance
 Public Sector Management
 International Business Management
 German Diploma
 Diplomacy
 Data Science and Analytics

Professional Pearson studies 

 Nursing
 Graphic Design
 Interior Design
 Fashion design

Vocational Studies 
Universum College besides the regular undergraduate and graduate programs, offers a variety of vocational training and certifications. Some of the training and certifications offered on regular basis are:

 Anglia Language Certifications
 Universum Blockchain Institute
 Training in Marketing and Sales
 Management and Public PR
 Training in Edexel package

Accreditation and Quality Assurance 
Universum College was accredited by the Kosovo Accreditation Agency for the first time in 2009 and re-accredited in 2022 for a period of 5 years, for Bachelor and Master Studies. Moreover, Universum College is licensed by the Ministry of Education, Science and Technology of the Republic of Kosovo. Universum College has approved the quality assurance principles outlined in the Declaration of the European University Association for Quality and Quality Assurance in European Higher Education. Universum is also a member of the Harvard Business School MOC Network and the only teaching institution for the Microeconomics of Competitiveness course in Kosovo.

Internationalization 
Erasmus+ Projects

Universum College has 152 Credit Mobility agreements and has been implementing 14 Capacity Building Projects within Erasmus + KA2 Action on Higher Education Funded by the EU Commission. 

Erasmus + Projects K2

Some of the projects that have had contributions to Universum are: 

 CONSUS - Connecting Science-Society Collaborations for Sustainability Innovation 
 TEMPUS PROJECT 
 TEMPUS PROJECT - “Supporting and Developing the Structures for QA at the Private Higher Education Institutions in Kosovo”.
 ITEM-(Innovative Teaching Education In Mathematics) 
 KALCEA
 INTERBA- (Internationalization at Home) 
 STEAMedu (MSc course in STEAM education) 
 IDEA- (Inclusive tertiary Education in the West Balkans) 
 E-UNITE 
 CULTUR ACT
 REBUS (Oct 2016-present) REady for Business: 
 STEPS (MSc in Sustainable Food Production Systems).
 E-VIVA (Enhancing and Validating Service-Related Competencies in Versatile Learning Environments in Western Balkan Universities) 
 DRIVE INTERBA KALCEA; STEAMedu
 Inclusive tertiary EDucation in the West BAlkanS – IDEA

Partnered with University of Northampton 
Universum College is accredited by The University of Northampton to offer programmes with English curricula and standards. Students who attend these programs will receive a University of Northampton degree upon graduation. UON is awarded Gold in the Government’s Teaching Excellence Framework (TEF).

Bachelor Programmes 

 BA GRAPHIC DESIGN
 BSC ARCHITECTURAL TECHNOLOGY
 BA FASHION
 BA GRAPHIC COMMUNICATION
 BSC COMPUTER SCIENCE
 BA BUSINESS AND MANAGEMENT

Master Programmes 

 MA BUSINESS AND MANAGEMENT
 MBA BUSINESS ADMINISTRATION

Double Degree with the Kajaani University Applied Sciences in Finland 
BA Degree Program in Business and Management is a three-year dual-degree program offered jointly by Universum College in Kosovo and the Kajaani University of Applied Sciences in Finland.

Upon completion of studies in this program, students receive a Finnish BA degree in Business Administration from Kajaani University of Applied Sciences and a second Bachelor of Arts in Business and Management at Universum College.

MBA Double Degree with the Ludwigshafen University of Business and Society in Germany 
Master’s Degree Program in Business Administration is a two-year dual-degree program offered jointly by Universum College in Kosovo and the Ludwigshafen University of Business and Society in Germany.

Within this program, studies start at Universum College and finish at Ludwigshafen University. Upon completion of studies in this program, students receive a German MBA degree in International Business Management from Ludwigshafen University and a second Master of Arts Management at Universum College. Within this program, studies start at Universum College and finish at Ludwigshafen University. Upon completion of studies in this program, students receive a German MBA degree in International Business Management from Ludwigshafen University and a second Master of Arts Management at Universum College.

Career & Welfare Office 
The Career and Welfare Office is an integral part of the Universum College, originally founded in 2010 aiming to foster and increase the employment of students by equipping them with the right skill set for the national and international labor market.

Each student is obliged to register in the “Internship and Career Orientation” module, usually provided in their second or third year of studies.

Dual Studies 
Universum College has developed partnerships and implemented projects with other companies for dual studies where students are offered full study funding, internships over three years and guaranteed employment in these companies in the departments of: Computer Science, Business and Management, German Language and Integrated Design.
So far Universum College offers dual studies with these companies:

 Vision Agency
 Fox Group
 Albina Dyla Company
 Viva Fresh Store
 Publications

BALKAN JOURNAL 
BALKAN JOURNAL (Supported by: The U.S. Department of State and The U.S. Embassy Pristina) International Journal of Balkan Policy Research is a double-blinded peer-reviewed Journal published by Universum college in Kosovo with the financial support of the US Embassy in Kosovo and the US State Department.

Other Publication 
Many other publications including staff publications, translations can be found on the official website of Universum College.

References

External links 
   

2005 establishments in Serbia